Panawathi Girl is an Australian musical by David Milroy. Set in 1969, the musical concerns a young Aboriginal woman Molly Chubb returning from university studies in Perth to Chubb Springs, her small country hometown in the northwest of Western Australia, to connect with her family and culture.

Productions 
A earlier version of the work titled Rodeo Moon was workshopped at the Western Australian Academy of Performing Arts in 2015.

Following a short season in Bunbury, Panawathi Girl was performed at His Majesty's Theatre in Perth from 8–13 February 2022, presented by Yirra Yaakin and the Perth Festival. The cast included Lila McGuire (Molly), Peter Docker (Chubb), Chris Isaacs (Ron), Grace Chow (Beth), Manuao TeAotonga (JoJo), Angelica Lockyer (Pansy), Wimiya Woodley (Billy), Teresa Rose (Ada), Gus Noakes (Knuckles), Luke Hewitt (Gough Whitlam), Geoff Kelso (John Gorton), Nadia Martich and Maitland Schnaars. The production was directed by Eva Grace Mullaley and choreographed by Janine Oxenham, with musical direction by Wayne Freer, set design by Bruce McKinven, costume design by  Lynn Ferguson and lighting design by Lucy Birkinshaw.

Reception 

Panawathi Girl received very favourable critical reception. The Guardian concluded that "brimming with heart and humour, Panawathi Girl is a wildly entertaining glimpse into an era of great optimism and change, prompting us to consider how far, or how little, we’ve come in the last 50 years". Limelight, in a five-star review, noted that "it occupies the same artistic space as Jimmy Chi’s musicals Bran Nue Dae and Corrugation Road and there is every reason to assume that Panawathi Girl will become a great classic".

References 

2022 musicals
Australian musicals
Indigenous Australian theatre
Original musicals
Plays set in Australia
Plays set in the 1960s